David Miličević (born 2 March 1992) is a Croatian handball player who currently plays for Zamet.

He has competed in SEHA League, EHF Cup and EHF Cup Winners' Cup.

International career
Miličević for various national team youth selections. He played for Croatia U-21 at 2011 Youth World Championship where they finished in eight place and 2013 Juniors World Championship where they lost in the third place match to France.

Honours
Meshkov Brest
Belarusian Premier League (1): 2013-14
Belarusian Cup (1): 2014
SEHA League runner-up (1): 2014

Al Sadd
GCC Club Handball Champions (1): 2015

Individual
Dukat Premier League most goals shot from 9m in 2012-13 season - 129 goals

References

External links
Eurohandball profile

1992 births
Living people
Croatian male handball players
People from Slavonski Brod
RK Zamet players